This is a list of the tallest one hundred structures in Canada, measured from the base to the tallest point. Which may be the roof top, antenna, spire, mast or as in the case with smokestacks and bridges, the highest structural point.

This list includes buildings, towers, transmission towers, chimneys, bridges and oil platforms.

There is a separate list for guyed masts since their heights are not fully verifiable and may be inaccurate by several metres; i.e. - several are measured to the height of the tallest transmitter on the mast, but this is not necessarily the tallest point of the tower.

The pinnacle height and roof height numbers are sourced from Skyscraperpage and/or the CTBUH. Where there is a conflict in the figures both heights are listed.

Tallest 100 structures in Canada (not including guyed masts)

Timeline of the tallest structures in Canada

Timeline of the tallest freestanding structures in Canada:

Timeline of the tallest structures overall in Canada:

Tallest structure by province
Ordered by tallest structure of any type ever built in said province. If that structure is not freestanding, then the tallest freestanding structure in said province is listed directly below the tallest structure in the above mentioned province.

Tallest observation towers in Canada

Tallest guyed masts in Canada

Tallest lattice towers in Canada
 indicates a structure that is no longer standing.

Tallest smokestacks/chimneys in Canada 
 indicates a structure that is no longer standing. Demolished structures are not ranked but left in their previous position on the list.

The Tracy Thermal Generating Station has four 449 ft (137 m) stacks.

Tallest destroyed/demolished structures in Canada

There are two separate lists, once again one for free standing structures and one for guyed masts. This is because of incomplete information regarding the height and number of demolished guyed masts.

Tallest freestanding demolished structures:

Tallest demolished guyed masts:

See also
 List of tallest buildings in Canada
 List of old Canadian buildings
 Architecture of Canada
 Architecture of Montreal
 Architecture of Ottawa
 Architecture of Toronto
 Architecture of Quebec City

Sources

Skyscraperpage

Emporis
 Calgary - http://www.emporis.com/en/wm/ci/bu/sk/li/?id=100992&bt=9&ht=3&sro=0
 Montreal - http://www.emporis.com/en/wm/ci/bu/sk/li/?id=100991&bt=9&ht=3&sro=0
 Niagara Falls - http://www.emporis.com/en/wm/ci/bu/sk/li/?id=101474&bt=9&ht=3&sro=0
 Toronto - http://www.emporis.com/en/wm/ci/bu/sk/li/?id=100993&bt=9&ht=3&sro=0
 Vancouver - http://www.emporis.com/en/wm/ci/bu/sk/li/?id=100997&bt=9&ht=3&sro=0
CTBUH

Other

References

External links

Canada